Rozelle Scheepers (born 27 September 1974) is a South African former cricketer who played as a wicket-keeper and right-handed batter. She appeared in one One Day International for South Africa in 2000, against England. She played domestic cricket for Northerns.

References

External links
 
 

1974 births
Living people
Cricketers from Pretoria
Afrikaner people
South African people of Dutch descent
South African women cricketers
South Africa women One Day International cricketers
Northerns women cricketers
Wicket-keepers